Steal Big Steal Little is a 1995 American comedy film directed by Andrew Davis and starring Andy García in dual roles. It also features Alan Arkin and Joe Pantoliano.

Plot
Mild-mannered, unassuming Ruben Martinez has a slick, unscrupulous twin brother who now goes by the name Robby Martin. They were orphans raised by a rich landowner named Clifford Downey and his dancer wife, Mona Rowland-Downey.

Upon her death, Mona leaves her entire  ranch in Santa Barbara, California in the care of only one son, Ruben. The other brother begins plotting how to win control of the property away from his estranged twin.

Ruben's main concern at the moment is that his wife Laura has left him. She cannot comprehend how her loving husband could have cheated on her with another woman.

Ruben tracks her to Chicago, where he meets used-car salesman Lou Perilli. He is assured that Laura will come back to him eventually. In the meantime, being pursued by a tough customer named Nick Zangaro about a debt he owes, Lou decides to make a quick getaway out west to Santa Barbara.

Eddie Agopian, a family lawyer, is in charge of watching over Ruben's interests. But suddenly he disappears. Local authorities, including Sheriff Otis and a corrupt judge, have begun harassing Ruben and the dozens of workers and friends who live at the ranch. They are the stooges of powerful businessman Reed Tyler, who has business interests with Ruben's brother, Robby.

Lou becomes a partner to the timid Ruben by promising to help him with his legal troubles. Lou has no lawyer experiences, but begins doing some investigating on Ruben's behalf and does the best he can in court. He also helps Ruben track down Eddie, who has absconded to Mexico with a stash of money.

A scam is exposed, revealing to Laura that it was not her husband who had relations with another woman but Robby, his evil twin. Ruben, Laura and Lou quickly hatch a scheme of their own, catching the sheriff and judge in compromising positions and luring Robby into one with the help of a couple of young women hired for the occasion.

The relationship between the brothers is healed a bit, if not completely, by the end as Ruben finds happiness at the ranch with his wide assortment of friends and family.

Cast

 Andy García as Ruben Martinez/Robby Martin
 Alan Arkin as Lou Perilli
 Rachel Ticotin as Laura
 Joe Pantoliano as Eddie Agopian
 Holland Taylor as Mona
 Ally Walker as Bonnie Martin
 Richard Bradford as Nick Zangaro
 David Ogden Stiers as Judge Myers
 Charles Rocket as Sheriff Otis
 Kevin McCarthy as Reed Tyler
 Candice Daly as Melissa

Reception
The film received poor reviews from critics and was a box office failure. It holds a rating of 15% on Rotten Tomatoes.

Production
Steal Big Steal Little was filmed on location at Rancho San Julian, Santa Barbara County, California.

Home formats
After the film's theatrical release, HBO released the film onto VHS. In 2004, HBO released the film onto DVD. The DVD is now discontinued and as of March 29, 2010, neither HBO or Focus Features, the latter of which has begun to acquire some of Savoy's movies, has announced any plans to release a new DVD of the film. For these reasons, used copies of the original DVD have gone for as much as $35 online.

External links

1995 films
1995 comedy films
American comedy films
Films about twin brothers
Films directed by Andrew Davis
Films scored by William Olvis
Films set in Chicago
Films set in Santa Barbara, California
Savoy Pictures films
1990s English-language films
1990s American films